The following is a list of events which took place in Ireland in 1710.

Incumbent
Monarch: Anne

Events
John Smithwick begins brewing Smithwick's ale at Kilkenny.

Births
William Annesley, 1st Viscount Glerawly, politician (d. 1770)

Deaths
April 7 – Sir Richard Bulkeley, 2nd Baronet, politician (b. 1660)
August 28 – Thomas Bligh, politician (b. 1654)
Richard Freeman, judge (b. 1646)

References

 
Years of the 18th century in Ireland
Ireland
1710s in Ireland